Jabrayil District is one of the 66 districts of Azerbaijan. It is located in the south-west of the country and belongs to the East Zangezur Economic Region. The district borders the districts of Khojavend, Fuzuli, Qubadli, Zangilan, and the Islamic Republic of Iran.

Its capital is Jabrayil, however since the city is completely ruined following its occupation by ethnic Armenian forces, the current de facto capital is Jojug Marjanly until Jabrayil is rebuilt. As of 2020, the district had a nominal population of 81,700.

Etymology 
The name of Jabrayil was taken from the name of the village Jabrayil that was the centre of the region. Father Jabrayil, who was the founder of the village Jabrayil, was one of the closes of the ruler by name Sultan Ahmed who lived in VIII century and the territories between Zuyaret Mountain and the river Araz belonged to Father Jabrayil and his sons.

History 
In pre-modern times, the current territory of Jabrayil District is believed to have formed the southern part of the canton (gavaṛ) of Myus Haband (known as Belukan or Dizak in the medieval era) of the historic Armenian province of Artsakh. Historian Samvel Karapetyan considers it likely the most of the area's Armenian population had left by the early 18th century. In the tsarist era, Jabrayil District (which was a part of the Jebrail Uyezd of the Elisabethpol Governorate) was mainly populated by nomadic or semi-nomadic Turkic-speakers (i.e. Azerbaijanis), as well as a minority of sedentary Armenians and a small number of Russian Molokan settlers. The nomadic population was settled in the Soviet period.

Armenian occupation 
The territory was occupied by Armenian forces on August 23, 1993, during the First Nagorno-Karabakh War. It was administrated as a part of Hadrut Province of the self-proclaimed Nagorno-Karabakh Republic, save for the village of Jojug Marjanly, which was recaptured on January 6, 1994 during Operation Horadiz. This village was the provisional centre of this district until the recapture of Jabrayil in 2020.

The region with 1,050 square km area, including 72 secondary schools, eight hospitals, five mosques, two museums, 120 historic monuments, 149 cultural centres and about 100 villages that remained in the area were totally destroyed.

Return to Azerbaijani control 
In the context of the 2020 Nagorno-Karabakh conflict, on October 9, 2020, the Azerbaijani Ministry of Defence announced the recapture of the district's central town, Jabrayil, from Armenian forces. On October 20, 2020, Azerbaijani President Ilham Aliyev announced the recapture of Safarsha, Hesengaydi, Fuganli, Imambaghi, Dash Veysalli, Aghtepe, Yarakhmedli villages of Jabrayil district. On October 21–22, 2020, 9 more villages of the district were recaptured according to Azerbaijani sources. In November 2020, Azerishiq announced that it had begun supplying electricity to the district.

Administrative structure 
According to the State Statistics Committee of Azerbaijan Republic as of 2013, there is 1 city, 4 settlements and 92 villages in the district which has a territory of 1050 km2.

Demographics 

At the time of the 1979 Soviet census, the ethnic makeup of the district's population whose ethnicity was known (43,047 people) was:
 Azerbaijanis: 42,415 (98.5%)
 Russians: 434 (1%)
 Armenians: 41 (0.1%)
 Others: 157 (0.4%)

Notable natives 
 Ashiq Qurbani (1477-1???) — was an Azerbaijani poet and folk singer
 Ashiq Peri (1811–1847) — was an Azerbaijani poet and folk singer

See also 
 Armenian-occupied territories surrounding Nagorno-Karabakh

References

External links 
 State Statistical Committee of Azerbaijan Republic. Population of Azerbaijan

 
Districts of Azerbaijan